Francis Newbery may refer to:

Francis Newbery (publisher) (1743–1818), English publisher, son of John Newbery
Francis Newbery, publisher of The Vicar of Wakefield, nephew of John Newbery
Francis Henry Newbery (1855–1946), or Fra Newbery, painter and director of the Glasgow School of Art, 1885–1917